The 2000 Faber Grand Prix was a women's tennis tournament played on indoor hardcourts in Hannover, Germany that was part of Tier II of the 2000 WTA Tour. It was the eighth and last edition of the tournament and was held from 14 February until 20 February 2000. First-seeded Serena Williams won the singles title and earned $87,000 first-prize money.

Finals

Singles

 Serena Williams defeated  Denisa Chládková, 6–1, 6–1
 It was Williams's 1st title of the year and the 6th of her career.

Doubles

 Åsa Carlsson /  Natasha Zvereva defeated  Silvia Farina /  Karina Habšudová, 6–3, 6–4

References

External links
 ITF tournament edition details
 Tournament draws

Faber Grand Prix
Faber Grand Prix
2000 in German women's sport
Ecken